Karl DeWolf (born 21 February 1972) is a French former ice hockey player. He competed in the men's tournaments at the 1998 Winter Olympics and the 2002 Winter Olympics.

References

External links

1972 births
Living people
Corsaires de Dunkerque players
Gothiques d'Amiens players
Hockey Club de Reims players
Olympic ice hockey players of France
Ice hockey players at the 1998 Winter Olympics
Ice hockey players at the 2002 Winter Olympics
Sportspeople from Lille